The Bohr–Einstein debates were a series of public disputes about quantum mechanics between Albert Einstein and Niels Bohr. Their debates are remembered because of their importance to the philosophy of science, insofar as the disagreements—and the outcome of Bohr's version of quantum mechanics becoming the prevalent view—form the root of the modern understanding of physics. Most of Bohr's version of the events held in Solvay in 1927 and other places was first written by Bohr decades later in an article titled, "Discussions with Einstein
on Epistemological Problems in Atomic Physics". Based on the article, the philosophical issue of the debate was whether Bohr's Copenhagen Interpretation of quantum mechanics, which centered on his belief of complementarity, was valid in explaining nature. Despite their differences of opinion and the succeeding discoveries that helped solidify quantum mechanics, Bohr and Einstein maintained a mutual admiration that was to last the rest of their lives.

The debates represent one of the highest points of scientific research in the first half of the twentieth century because it called attention to an element of quantum theory, quantum nonlocality, which is central to our modern understanding of the physical world. The consensus view of professional physicists has been that Bohr proved victorious in his defense of quantum theory, and definitively established the fundamental probabilistic character of quantum measurement.

Pre-revolutionary debates
Einstein was the first physicist to say that Planck's discovery of the quantum (h) would require a rewriting of the laws of physics. To support his point, in 1905 he proposed that light sometimes acts as a particle which he called a light quantum (see photon and wave–particle duality). Bohr was one of the most vocal opponents of the photon idea and did not openly embrace it until 1925. The photon appealed to Einstein because he saw it as a physical reality (although a confusing one) behind the numbers presented by Planck mathematically in 1900. Bohr disliked it because it made the choice of mathematical solution arbitrary. Bohr did not like a scientist having to choose between equations. This was perhaps the first real Bohr-Einstein debate. Einstein had proposed the photon in 1905, and Compton proved that the photon existed experimentally in 1922, but Bohr refused to believe the photon existed even then. Bohr fought back against the existence of the quantum of light (photon) by writing the BKS theory in 1924. However, Einstein was right and Bohr proved to be wrong about light quanta.

Although Bohr and Einstein disagreed, they were great friends all their lives and enjoyed using each other as a foil.

The year 1913 brought the Bohr model of the hydrogen atom, which made use of the quantum to explain the atomic spectrum although at the time Bohr did not believe the atom to be wave-like but like a solar system so that the equations he used were for rotational orbits of particles similar to planets, yet Planck’s constant had been invented for light radiation in black bodies. Einstein was at first skeptical about using h for a solar system style atom, but quickly changed his mind and admitted his shift in mindset. From 1913 to 1919, Einstein studied and revised Arnold Sommerfeld’s extension of the Bohr atom to include the Stark effect and Zeeman effect. The coefficients Einstein created during this time are still named for him and still in use today.

The quantum revolution
The quantum revolution of the mid-1920s occurred under the direction of both Einstein and Bohr, and their post-revolutionary debates were about making sense of the change. The shocks for Einstein began in 1925 when Werner Heisenberg introduced matrix equations that removed the Newtonian elements of space and time from any underlying reality. However, when Erwin Schrödinger sent a preprint of his new equation to Einstein, Einstein wrote back hailing his equation as a decisive advance of “true genius.” But the next shock came in 1926 when Max Born proposed that mechanics were to be understood as a probability without any causal explanation.

Both Einstein and Erwin Schrödinger rejected this interpretation with its renunciation of causality which had been a key feature of science previous to Quantum Mechanics and was still a feature of General Relativity. In a 1926 letter to Max Born, Einstein wrote: "quantum mechanics is certainly imposing. But an inner voice tells me that it is not yet the real thing. The theory says a lot, but does not really bring us any closer to the secret of the “old one”. I, at any rate, am convinced that He [God] is not playing at dice." At first, even Heisenberg had heated disputes with Bohr that his matrix mechanics was not compatible with the 
Schrödinger Equation. And Bohr was at first opposed to the Uncertainty Principle. But by the Fifth Solvay Conference held in October 1927 Heisenberg and Born concluded that the revolution was over and nothing further was needed. It was at that last stage that Einstein's skepticism turned to dismay. He believed that much had been accomplished, but the reasons for the mechanics still needed to be understood.

Einstein's refusal to accept the revolution as complete reflected his desire to see developed a model for the underlying causes from which these apparent random statistical methods resulted. He did not reject the idea that positions in space-time could never be completely known but did not want to allow the uncertainty principle to necessitate a seemingly random, non-deterministic mechanism by which the laws of physics operated. Einstein himself was a statistical thinker but disagreed that no more needed to be discovered and clarified. Einstein worked the rest of his life to discover a new theory that would make sense of Quantum Mechanics and return causality to science, what many now call, the Theory of Everything. Bohr, meanwhile, was dismayed by none of the elements that troubled Einstein. He made his own peace with the contradictions by proposing a principle of complementarity that emphasized the role of the observer over the observed.

Post-revolution: First stage
As mentioned above, Einstein's position underwent significant modifications over the course of the years. In the first stage, Einstein refused to accept quantum indeterminism and sought to demonstrate that the principle of indeterminacy could be violated, suggesting ingenious thought experiments which should permit the accurate determination of incompatible variables, such as position and velocity, or to explicitly reveal simultaneously the wave and the particle aspects of the same process.  (The main source and substance for these thought experiments is solely from Bohr’s account twenty years later.) Bohr admits: “As regards the account of the conversations I am of course aware that I am relying only on my own memory, just as I am prepared for the possibility that many features of the development of quantum theory, in which Einstein has played so large a part, may appear to himself in a different light.”

Einstein's argument 
The first serious attack by Einstein on the "orthodox" conception took place during the Fifth Solvay International Conference on Electrons and Photons in 1927. Einstein pointed out how it was possible to take advantage of the (universally accepted) laws of conservation of energy and of impulse (momentum) in order to obtain information on the state of a particle in a process of interference which, according to the principle of indeterminacy or that of complementarity, should not be accessible.

In order to follow his argumentation and to evaluate Bohr's response, it is convenient to refer to the experimental apparatus illustrated in figure A. A beam of light perpendicular to the X axis propagates in the direction z and encounters a screen S1 with a narrow (relative to the wavelength of the ray) slit. After having passed through the slit, the wave function diffracts with an angular opening that causes it to encounter a second screen S2 with two slits. The successive propagation of the wave results in the formation of the interference figure on the final screen F.

At the passage through the two slits of the second screen S2, the wave aspects of the process become essential. In fact, it is precisely the interference between the two terms of the quantum superposition corresponding to states in which the particle is localized in one of the two slits which implies that the particle is "guided" preferably into the zones of constructive interference and cannot end up in a point in the zones of destructive interference (in which the wave function is nullified). It is also important to note that any experiment designed to evidence the "corpuscular" aspects of the process at the passage of the screen S2 (which, in this case, reduces to the determination of which slit the particle has passed through) inevitably destroys the wave aspects, implies the disappearance of the interference figure and the emergence of two concentrated spots of diffraction which confirm our knowledge of the trajectory followed by the particle.

At this point Einstein brings into play the first screen as well and argues as follows: since the incident particles have velocities (practically) perpendicular to the screen S1, and since it is only the interaction with this screen that can cause a deflection from the original direction of propagation, by the law of conservation of impulse which implies that the sum of the impulses of two systems which interact is conserved, if the incident particle is deviated toward the top, the screen will recoil toward the bottom and vice versa. In realistic conditions the mass of the screen is so large that it will remain stationary, but, in principle, it is possible to measure even an infinitesimal recoil. If we imagine taking the measurement of the impulse of the screen in the direction X after every single particle has passed, we can know, from the fact that the screen will be found recoiled toward the top (bottom), whether the particle in question has been deviated toward the bottom or top, and therefore through which slit in S2 the particle has passed. But since the determination of the direction of the recoil of the screen after the particle has passed cannot influence the successive development of the process, we will still have an interference figure on the screen F. The interference takes place precisely because the state of the system is the superposition of two states whose wave functions are non-zero only near one of the two slits. On the other hand, if every particle passes through only the slit b or the slit c, then the set of systems is the statistical mixture of the two states, which means that interference is not possible. If Einstein is correct, then there is a violation of the principle of indeterminacy.

This thought experiment was begun in a simpler form during the General Discussion portion of the actual proceedings during the 1927 Solvay conference. In those official proceedings, Bohr’s reply is recorded as: “I feel myself in a very difficult position because I don’t understand precisely the point that Einstein is trying to make.” Einstein had explained, “it could happen that the same elementary process produces an action in two or several places on the screen. But the interpretation, according to which psi squared expresses the probability that this particular particle is found at a given point, assumes an entirely peculiar mechanism of action at a distance.” It is clear from this that Einstein was referring to separability (in particular, and most importantly local causality, i.e. locality), not indeterminacy.  In fact, Paul Ehrenfest wrote a letter to Bohr stating that the 1927 thought experiments of Einstein had nothing to do with the Uncertainty Relations, as Einstein had already accepted these “and for a long time never doubted.”

Bohr's response 
Bohr evidently misunderstood Einstein's argument about the quantum mechanical violation of relativistic causality (locality) and instead focused on the consistency of quantum indeterminacy.  Bohr's response was to illustrate Einstein's idea more clearly using the diagram in Figure C. (Figure C shows a fixed screen S1 that is bolted down. Then try to imagine one that can slide up or down along a rod instead of a fixed bolt.) Bohr observes that extremely precise knowledge of any (potential) vertical motion of the screen is an essential presupposition in Einstein's argument. In fact, if its velocity in the direction X before the passage of the particle is not known with a precision substantially greater than that induced by the recoil (that is, if it were already moving vertically with an unknown and greater velocity than that which it derives as a consequence of the contact with the particle), then the determination of its motion after the passage of the particle would not give the information we seek. However, Bohr continues, an extremely precise determination of the velocity of the screen, when one applies the principle of indeterminacy, implies an inevitable imprecision of its position in the direction X.  Before the process even begins, the screen would therefore occupy an indeterminate position at least to a certain extent (defined by the formalism). Now consider, for example, the point d in figure A, where the interference is destructive. Any displacement of the first screen would make the lengths of the two paths, a–b–d and a–c–d, different from those indicated in the figure. If the difference between the two paths varies by half a wavelength, at point d there will be constructive rather than destructive interference.  The ideal experiment must average over all the possible positions of the screen S1, and, for every position, there corresponds, for a certain fixed point F, a different type of interference, from the perfectly destructive to the perfectly constructive. The effect of this averaging is that the pattern of interference on the screen F will be uniformly grey. Once more, our attempt to evidence the corpuscular aspects in S2 has destroyed the possibility of interference in F, which depends crucially on the wave aspects.

As Bohr recognized, for the understanding of this phenomenon "it is decisive that, contrary to genuine instruments of measurement, these bodies along with the particles would constitute, in the case under examination, the system to which the quantum-mechanical formalism must apply.  With respect to the precision of the conditions under which one can correctly apply the formalism, it is essential to include the entire experimental apparatus. In fact, the introduction of any new apparatus, such as a mirror, in the path of a particle could introduce new effects of interference which influence essentially the predictions about the results which will be registered at the end." Further along, Bohr attempts to resolve this ambiguity concerning which parts of the system should be considered macroscopic and which not:

In particular, it must be very clear that...the unambiguous use of spatiotemporal concepts in the description of atomic phenomena must be limited to the registration of observations which refer to images on a photographic lens or to analogous practically irreversible effects of amplification such as the formation of a drop of water around an ion in a dark room.

Bohr's argument about the impossibility of using the apparatus proposed by Einstein to violate the principle of indeterminacy depends crucially on the fact that a macroscopic system (the screen S1) obeys quantum laws. On the other hand, Bohr consistently held that, in order to illustrate the microscopic aspects of reality, it is necessary to set off a process of amplification, which involves macroscopic apparatuses, whose fundamental characteristic is that of obeying classical laws and which can be described in classical terms. This ambiguity would later come back in the form of what is still called today the measurement problem.

However, Bohr in his article refuting the EPR paper, states “there is no question of a mechanical disturbance of the system under investigation.” Heisenberg quotes Bohr as saying, “I find all such assertions as ‘observation introduces uncertainty into the phenomenon’ inaccurate and misleading.” Manjit Kumar’s book on the Bohr-Einstein debates finds these assertions by Bohr contrary to his arguments.

The principle of indeterminacy applied to time and energy

In many textbook examples and popular discussions of quantum mechanics, the principle of indeterminacy is explained by reference to the pair of variables position and velocity (or momentum). It is important to note that the wave nature of physical processes implies that there must exist another relation of indeterminacy: that between time and energy. In order to comprehend this relation, it is convenient to refer to the experiment illustrated in
Figure D, which results in the propagation of a wave which is limited in spatial extension. Assume that, as illustrated in the figure, a ray which is extremely extended longitudinally is propagated toward a screen with a slit furnished with a shutter which remains open only for a very brief interval of time . Beyond the slit, there will be a wave of limited spatial extension which continues to propagate toward the right.

A perfectly monochromatic wave (such as a musical note which cannot be divided into harmonics) has infinite spatial extent.
It then happens that at a certain instant, there exists a spatial region (which moves over time) in which the contributions of the various fields of the superposition add up constructively. Nonetheless, according to a precise mathematical theorem, as we move far away from this region, the phases of the various fields, at any specified point, are distributed causally and destructive interference is produced. The region in which the wave has non-zero amplitude is therefore spatially limited.

 

Remembering that in the universal relation of Planck, frequency and energy are proportional:

 

it follows immediately from the preceding inequality that the particle associated with the wave should possess an energy which is not perfectly defined (since different frequencies are involved in the superposition) and consequently there is indeterminacy in energy:

 

From this it follows immediately that:

 

which is the relation of indeterminacy between time and energy.

Einstein's second criticism

At the sixth Congress of Solvay in 1930, the indeterminacy relation just discussed was Einstein's target of criticism. His idea contemplates the existence of an experimental apparatus which was subsequently designed by Bohr in such a way as to emphasize the essential elements and the key points which he would use in his response.

Einstein considers a box (called Einstein's box; see figure) containing electromagnetic radiation and a clock which controls the opening of a shutter which covers a hole made in one of the walls of the box. The shutter uncovers the hole for a time  which can be chosen arbitrarily. During the opening, we are to suppose that a photon, from among those inside the box, escapes through the hole. In this way a wave of limited spatial extension has been created, following the explanation given above. In order to challenge the indeterminacy relation between time and energy, it is necessary to find a way to determine with adequate precision the energy that the photon has brought with it. At this point, Einstein turns to his celebrated relation between mass and energy of special relativity: . From this it follows that knowledge of the mass of an object provides a precise indication about its energy. The argument is therefore very simple: if one weighs the box before and after the opening of the shutter and if a certain amount of energy has escaped from the box, the box will be lighter. The variation in mass multiplied by 
will provide precise knowledge of the energy emitted.
Moreover, the clock will indicate the precise time at which the event of the particle's emission took place. Since, in principle, the mass of the box can be determined to an arbitrary degree of accuracy, the energy emitted can be determined with a precision  as accurate as one desires. Therefore, the product  can be rendered less than what is implied by the principle of indeterminacy.

The idea is particularly acute and the argument seemed unassailable. It's important to consider the impact of all of these exchanges on the people involved at the time. Leon Rosenfeld, a scientist who had participated in the Congress, described the event several years later:

It was a real shock for Bohr...who, at first, could not think of a solution. For the entire evening he was extremely agitated, and he continued passing from one scientist to another, seeking to persuade them that it could not be the case, that it would have been the end of physics if Einstein were right; but he couldn't come up with any way to resolve the paradox. I will never forget the image of the two antagonists as they left the club: Einstein, with his tall and commanding figure, who walked tranquilly, with a mildly ironic smile, and Bohr who trotted along beside him, full of excitement...The morning after saw the triumph of Bohr.

Bohr's Triumph
The "Triumph of Bohr" consisted in his demonstrating, once again, that Einstein's subtle argument was not conclusive, but even more so in the way that he arrived at this conclusion by appealing precisely to one of the great ideas of Einstein: the principle of equivalence between gravitational mass and inertial mass, together with the time dilation of special relativity, and a consequence of these—the Gravitational redshift. Bohr showed that, in order for Einstein's experiment to function, the box would have to be suspended on a spring in the middle of a gravitational field. In order to obtain a measurement of the weight of the box, a pointer would have to be attached to the box which corresponded with the index on a scale. After the release of a photon, a mass  could be added to the box to restore it to its original position and this would allow us to determine the energy  that was lost when the photon left. The box is immersed in a gravitational field of strength , and the gravitational redshift affects the speed of the clock, yielding uncertainty  in the time  required for the pointer to return to its original position. Bohr gave the following calculation establishing the uncertainty relation .

Let the error in the position of the pointer be . Adding the load  to the box imparts a momentum  that we can measure with an accuracy , where  ≈ . Clearly , and therefore . We have therefore proven the claimed .

More recent analyses of the photon box debate questions Bohr’s understanding of Einstein’s thought experiment, referring instead to a prelude to the EPR paper, focusing on inseparability rather than indeterminism being at issue.

Post-revolution: Second stage

The second phase of Einstein's "debate" with Bohr and the orthodox interpretation is characterized by an acceptance of the fact that it is, as a practical matter, impossible to simultaneously determine the values of certain incompatible quantities, but the rejection that this implies that these quantities do not actually have precise values. Einstein rejects the probabilistic interpretation of Born and insists that quantum probabilities are epistemic and not ontological in nature. As a consequence, the theory must be incomplete in some way.  He recognizes the great value of the theory, but suggests that it "does not tell the whole story", and, while providing an appropriate description at a certain level, it gives no information on the more fundamental underlying level:

I have the greatest consideration for the goals which are pursued by the physicists of the latest generation which go under the name of quantum mechanics, and I believe that this theory represents a profound level of truth, but I also believe that the restriction to laws of a statistical nature will turn out to be transitory....Without doubt quantum mechanics has grasped an important fragment of the truth and will be a paragon for all future fundamental theories, for the fact that it must be deducible as a limiting case from such foundations, just as electrostatics is deducible from Maxwell's equations of the electromagnetic field or as thermodynamics is deducible from statistical mechanics.

These thoughts of Einstein would set off a line of research into hidden variable theories, such as the Bohm interpretation, in an attempt to complete the edifice of quantum theory. If quantum mechanics can be made complete in Einstein's sense, it cannot be done locally; this fact was demonstrated by John Stewart Bell with the formulation of Bell's inequality in 1964. Although, the Bell inequality ruled out local hidden variable theories, Bohm’s theory was not ruled out. A 2007 experiment ruled out a large class of non-Bohmian non-local hidden variable theories, though not Bohmian mechanics itself.

Post-revolution: Third stage

The argument of EPR

In 1935 Einstein, Boris Podolsky and Nathan Rosen developed an argument, published in the magazine Physical Review with the title Can Quantum-Mechanical Description of Physical Reality Be Considered Complete?, based on an entangled state of two systems. Before coming to this argument, it is necessary to formulate another hypothesis that comes out of Einstein's work in relativity: the principle of locality. The elements of physical reality which are objectively possessed cannot be influenced instantaneously at a distance.

David Bohm picked up the EPR argument in 1951. In his textbook Quantum Theory, he reformulated it in terms of an entangled state of two particles, which can be summarized as follows:

1) Consider a system of two photons which at time t are located, respectively, in the spatially distant regions A and B and which are also in the entangled state of polarization  described below:

2) At time t the photon in region A is tested for vertical polarization. Suppose that the result of the measurement is that the photon passes through the filter. According to the reduction of the wave packet, the result is that, at time t + dt, the system becomes

 

3) At this point, the observer in A who carried out the first measurement on photon 1, without doing anything else that could disturb the system or the other photon ("assumption (R)", below), can predict with certainty that photon 2 will pass a test of vertical polarization. It follows that photon 2 possesses an element of physical reality: that of having a vertical polarization.

4) According to the assumption of locality, it cannot have been the action carried out in A which created this element of reality for photon 2. Therefore, we must conclude that the photon possessed the property of being able to pass the vertical polarization test before and independently of the measurement of photon 1.

5) At time t, the observer in A could have decided to carry out a test of polarization at 45°, obtaining a certain result, for example, that the photon passes the test. In that case, he could have concluded that photon 2 turned out to be polarized at 45°. Alternatively, if the photon did not pass the test, he could have concluded that photon 2 turned out to be polarized at 135°. Combining one of these alternatives with the conclusion reached in 4, it seems that photon 2, before the measurement took place, possessed both the property of being able to pass with certainty a test of vertical polarization and the property of being able to pass with certainty a test of polarization at either 45° or 135°. These properties are incompatible according to the formalism.

6) Since natural and obvious requirements have forced the conclusion that photon 2 simultaneously possesses incompatible properties, this means that, even if it is not possible to determine these properties simultaneously and with arbitrary precision, they are nevertheless possessed objectively by the system. But quantum mechanics denies this possibility and it is therefore an incomplete theory.

Bohr's response
Bohr's response to this argument was published, five months later than the original publication of EPR, in the same magazine Physical Review and with exactly the same title as the original. The crucial point of Bohr's answer is distilled in a passage which he later had republished in Paul Arthur Schilpp's book Albert Einstein, scientist-philosopher in honor of the seventieth birthday of Einstein. Bohr attacks assumption (R) of EPR by stating:

The statement of the criterion in question is ambiguous with regard to the expression "without disturbing the system in any way". Naturally, in this case no mechanical disturbance of the system under examination can take place in the crucial stage of the process of measurement. But even in this stage there arises the essential problem of an influence on the precise conditions which define the possible types of prediction which regard the subsequent behaviour of the system...their arguments do not justify their conclusion that the quantum description turns out to be essentially incomplete...This description can be characterized as a rational use of the possibilities of an unambiguous interpretation of the process of measurement compatible with the finite and uncontrollable interaction between the object and the instrument of measurement in the context of quantum theory.

Confirmatory experiments

Years after the exposition of Einstein via his EPR experiment, many physicists started performing experiments to show that Einstein's view of a spooky action in a distance is indeed consistent with the laws of physics. The first experiment to definitively prove that this was the case was in 1949, when physicists Chien-Shiung Wu and her colleague Irving Shaknov showcased this theory in real time using photons. Their work was published in the new year of the succeeding decade.

Later in 1975, Alain Aspect proposed in an article, an experiment meticulous enough to be irrefutable: Proposed experiment to test the non-separability of quantum mechanics. This led Aspect, together with physicists Philippe Grangier, Gérard Roger, and Jean Dalibard) to set up several increasingly complex experiments between 1980 and 1982 that further established quantum entanglement. Finally in 1998, the Geneva experiment tested the correlation between two detectors set 30 kilometres apart, virtually across the whole city, using the Swiss optical fibre telecommunication network. The distance gave the necessary time to commute the angles of the polarizers. It was therefore possible to have a completely random electrical shunting. Furthermore, the two distant polarizers were entirely independent. The measurements were recorded on each side, and compared after each experiment by dating each measurement using an atomic clock. The experiment once again verified entanglement under the strictest and most ideal conditions possible. If Aspect's experiment implied that a hypothetical coordination signal travel twice as fast as c, Geneva's reached 10 million times c.

Post-revolution: Fourth stage
In his last writing on the topic, Einstein further refined his position, making it completely clear that  what really disturbed him about the quantum theory was the problem of the total renunciation of all minimal standards of realism, even at the microscopic level, that the acceptance of the completeness of the theory implied. Since the early days of quantum theory the assumption of locality and Lorentz invariance guided his thoughts and led to his determination that if we demand strict locality then hidden variables are naturally implied apropos EPR. Bell, starting from this EPR logic (which is widely misunderstood or forgotten) showed that local hidden variables imply a conflict with experiment. Ultimately what was at stake for Einstein was the assumption that physical reality be universally local. Although the majority of experts in the field agree that Einstein was wrong, the current understanding is still not complete (see Interpretation of quantum mechanics).

See also 

 Afshar's experiment
 Bell test experiments
 Bell's theorem
 Complementarity
 Copenhagen interpretation
 Double-slit experiment
 Einstein's thought experiments
 Invariant set postulate
 Quantum (book)
 Quantum eraser
 Schrödinger's cat
 Uncertainty principle
 Wheeler's delayed choice experiment
 Superdeterminism

References

Sources

 
 
 
  Translated as "Quantum-theoretical Re-interpretation of kinematic and mechanical relations" in

Further reading 
 Boniolo, G., (1997) Filosofia della Fisica, Mondadori, Milan.
 Bolles, Edmund Blair (2004) Einstein Defiant, Joseph Henry Press, Washington, D.C.
 Born, M. (1973) The Born Einstein Letters, Walker and Company, New York, 1971.
 Ghirardi, Giancarlo, (1997) Un'Occhiata alle Carte di Dio, Il Saggiatore, Milan.
 Pais, A., (1986) Subtle is the Lord... The Science and Life of Albert Einstein, Oxford University Press, Oxford, 1982.
 Shilpp, P.A., (1958) Albert Einstein: Philosopher-Scientist, Northwestern University and Southern Illinois University, Open Court, 1951.

Quantum measurement
Albert Einstein
Philosophy of physics
History of physics
Niels Bohr
Scientific debates